Ardmore City Schools is a public school district in the United States serving parts of Ardmore, Oklahoma. The school district has a total enrollment of 3,081 as of the 2009–2010 school year. The district covers 26.42 square miles of land.

In 2013 the district held a meeting to promote a $31 million school bond proposal. The proposal calls for the construction of a new campus for Lincoln Elementary School, additional classrooms for two elementary schools, and a new roof for the middle school.

Schools
As of 2013 some of the school campuses were built in the late 1900s. Sonny Bates, the superintendent, said that year that some school roofs were leaky.

In 2010 the district closed Franklin Elementary School.

References

External links

 Ardmore City Schools
 "Changes Ahead for Ardmore's Elementary Schools." (Archive) KTEN. June 25, 2008.

School districts in Oklahoma
Education in Carter County, Oklahoma